Dreher is a surname. Notable people with the surname include:

Anton Dreher (1810–1863), Austrian brewer
Aristotle Dreher (born 1978), American musician
Axel Dreher (born 1972), German economist
Bernd Dreher (born 1966), German footballer
Carl Dreher (1896–1976), American electrical engineer
Christoph Dreher (born 1952), German filmmaker
Claudia Dreher (born 1971), German long-distance runner
Ferd Dreher (1913–1996), American football player
Ferdinand Dreher, German revolutionary
Joseph Dreher (1884–1941), French athlete
Lachlan Dreher (born 1967), Australian field hockey player
Lance Dreher (born 1955), American bodybuilder
Mark Dreher (born 1961), Australian rules footballer
Michael Dreher (disambiguation), multiple people
Peter Dreher (1932–2020), German artist
Rod Dreher (born 1967), American writer
Sarah Dreher (1937–2012), American writer
Uwe Dreher (1960–2016), German footballer
Wilhelm Dreher (1892–1969), German politician

See also
 Jacob Wingard Dreher House, historic home in Lexington County, South Carolina